The Penske PC-9 and Penske PC-9B are USAC and CART open-wheel race car chassis, designed by British designer Geoff Ferris at Penske Racing, which was constructed for competition in the 1980 and 1981 IndyCar seasons, as well as the 1980 season and 1981–82 USAC Champ Car seasons. It also notably successfully won the 1981 Indianapolis 500, being driven by Bobby Unser.

References

Racing cars
American Championship racing cars